Midi lidi are a Czech electro band, consisting of Petr Marek, Prokop Holoubek, Markéta Lisá, Tomino Kelar, and others. The group wrote music for Marek Najbrt's films Protector and Polski film, as well as the documentary film Czech Peace. They also wrote the soundtrack for the series Kancelář Blaník, which is hosted on the Czech internet television channel stream.cz

Discography

Albums 
 Čekání na robota (2007), published X Production
 Protektor (2009), soundtrack for the film Protector
 Hastrmans, Tatrmans & Bubáks (2009), X Production
 Operace "Kindigo!" (2011), X Production
 Give Masterpiece a Chance! (2016), X Production
 Prezident Blaník (Original Soundtrack) (2018)
 Nikdo se ti nebude smát,  když budeš mít lidi rád (2021), Bumbum Satori
 Heal The World, konečně! (2021), Bumbum Satori

References

External links 

 Oficial site

Musical groups established in 2006
Czech electronic music groups
2006 establishments in the Czech Republic